Ay Ata (Old Turkic: 𐰖:𐱃𐰀) is one of the mythological entities in Turkic mythology and Tengrism. Ay Ata literally means Grandfather Moon. God.

Description
According to the mythology, he is a moon god, and he has been living in sixth floor of the sky with Gun Ana, the sun goddess, who he is coupled with. While Gün Ana is symbol of warmness and hotness, Ay Dede is the symbol of cold.

In Turkey, he is well known in modern times, Ay Dede is popular amongst children due to tales being told about him. The mythology is more common amongst Siberian Turks, such as Altaians and Yakuts, who still have populations who actively practice Tengrism.

Notably, in the Epic of Oghuz Khan, Ay Tanrı also is mentioned as the father of Oghuz Khan, even though that part remains somewhat unclear. It's also notable Oghuz Khan's second son was named Ayhan (Ay Khan, "moon khan").

Aisar
From ancient times, the Turkic people believed that humans had secret lunar powers (Aisar or Aysar). Female pregnancy lasts about nine lunar months, and women often deliver during a full moon.

The three phases of the moon were also symbolic. It was believed that at "Ai Naazy" (new moon) the Moon symbolized a growing young child, who is pure and modest. At "Ai Toly" (full moon), the Moon personified a mature good-natured mother or father. At "Ai Karty" (old moon) the moon aged became wise. But at the same time quarrelsome and malicious. Before its death, the moon reigned over a totally dark night. The forces of life and death met during these nights. After the meeting they separated, only to meet again after a defined period. When the old moon died, a new one was born, and so on, ad infinitum.

The Turkic people trusted the magic influence of the Moon. He was their sole "night lantern". The celebrations of malicious spirits occurred mostly at night. The rituals and trances of witches and demons were always timed according to the phases of the Moon. In Turkish culture illnesses were expected to get worse at night, and cause more deaths. To please the Moon God, those born during a full moon were given names as such: Aisylu (Aysulu), Aituly (Aytulu), Ainir (Aynur), Aizirek (Ayzerek), and Ainaz (Aynaz).

See also
 List of lunar deities

References

Legends of Ay Dede
 Ay Dede and Orphan Girl
 Ay Dede and Seven Head-Giant War
 Ay Dede and Wolves
 Legends of Children Whose Father is the Moon

Sources
 Türk Mitolojisi, Murat Uraz
 Bahaeddin Ögel, Türk Mitolojisi (Vol-1, Page 132)

External links
 Türk mitolojisi'ne göre güneş, ay ve yıldızlar 
 Türk mitolojisinde ay 
 Türk mitolojisinde ay 

Sky and weather gods
Lunar gods
Tengriism
Turkic deities